Golden Lion FC is a football club from Martinique, based in the town of Saint-Joseph. They play in the Martinique Division d'Honneur, the top-division of football in Martinique, having been promoted following the 2008–09 season. They won the league for the first time in 2014–15.

Squad 

2022 Caribbean Club Shield
2021-2022

Achievements
Martinique Division d'Honneur
 Champions (4): 2014–15, 2015–16, 2020–21, 2021–22

Coupe de la Martinique
 Winner (2): 2015–16, 2018–19.
 Runners-up (2): 2010–11, 2013–14.

Trophée du Conseil Général
 Winner (2): 2015, 2016.
 Runners-up (2): 2018, 2019.

External links
 Club info – French Football Federation

References

Football clubs in Martinique